The  or  (Latin for "Jewish tax") was a tax imposed on Jews in the Roman Empire after the destruction of Jerusalem and its Temple in AD 70. Revenues were directed to the Temple of Jupiter Optimus Maximus in Rome.

The tax measure improved Rome's finances and also worked as a deterrent against proselytizing. Those who paid the tax did not have to sacrifice to Roman gods.

Contemporary sources
Modern knowledge of the fiscus Judaicus is found in four primary sources:
 A small number of Roman Egyptian tax receipts
 A passage from The Jewish War by Josephus
 A passage from The Twelve Caesars by Suetonius
 A passage from the Roman History by Cassius Dio

Imposition

The tax was initially imposed by Roman emperor Vespasian as one of the measures against Jews as a result of the First Roman-Jewish War, or first Jewish revolt of AD 66–73. The tax was imposed on all Jews throughout the empire, not just on those who took part in the revolt against Rome. The tax was imposed after the destruction of the Second Temple in AD 70 in place of the levy (or tithe) payable by Jews towards the upkeep of the Temple. The amount levied was two denarii, equivalent to the one-half of a shekel that observant Jews had previously paid for the upkeep of the Temple of Jerusalem. The tax was to go instead to the Temple of Capitoline Jupiter, the major center of ancient Roman religion. The fiscus Iudaicus was a humiliation for the Jews. In Rome, a special procurator known as procurator ad capitularia Iudaeorum was responsible for the collection of the tax. Only those who had abandoned Judaism were exempt from paying it.

While the tax paid for the Temple of Jerusalem was payable only by adult men between the ages of 20 and 50, the fiscus Iudaicus was imposed on all Jews, including women, children, and elderly—and even Jewish slaves. In Egypt, the documentary evidence (in the form of receipts) confirms the payment of the tax by women and children. The oldest person known from these receipts to have paid the fiscus Iudaicus was a 61-year-old woman, which led Sherman LeRoy Wallace to conjecture that the tax was levied only until the age of 62, as was the regular Roman poll tax paid by individuals throughout the Empire.

The tax was continued even after the completion of the reconstruction of the Capitoline temple for its upkeep.

Domitian
Domitian, who ruled between 81 and 96 AD, expanded the fiscus Iudaicus to include not only born Jews and converts to Judaism, but also those who concealed the fact that they were Jews or observed Jewish customs. Suetonius relates that when he was young, an old man of 90 was examined to see whether he was circumcised, which shows that during this period the tax was levied even on those above the age of 62. Louis Feldman argues that the increased harshness was caused by the success of the Jewish (and possibly Christian) proselytism.

Domitian applied the tax even to those who merely "lived like Jews":

Domitian's ruling opened the door to possibilities of blackmail in Rome and in all Italy. Charges of following Judaism were easily made, but difficult to disprove, not least because the practices of certain philosophical sects resembled some Jewish customs. As a result, many people chose to settle with the accusers out of court rather than risk the uncertainties of judicial hearings, thus effectively encouraging the blackmailers.
Titus Flavius Clemens was put to death for "living a Jewish life" or "drifting into Jewish ways" in the year AD 95, which may well have been related to the administration of the fiscus Judaicus under Domitian.

Schism between Judaism and Christianity

The fiscus Iudaicus was originally imposed on Jews. At the time neither the Romans nor, probably, the Christians considered their religion to be separate from Judaism. If anything they would have considered themselves as a Jewish sect. Jewish and non-Jewish Christians would therefore be liable to the tax, Marius Heemstra argues.

In 96 AD, Domitian's successor Nerva reformed the administration of fiscus Iudaicus and redefined Judaism as a religion. This meant that Judaism was seen as distinct from Christianity and only those practising the former were liable to the tax. This paved the way for the Roman persecution of Christians that began a few years later and continued until the Edict of Milan in 313. The coins of Nerva bear the legend fisci Iudaici calumnia sublata "abolition of malicious prosecution in connection with the Jewish tax," in reference to his reform of the harsh policies of Domitian.

Abolition

It remains unclear when exactly the fiscus Iudaicus was abolished. Documentary evidence confirms the collection of the tax in the middle of the 2nd century, and literary sources indicate that the tax was still in existence in the early 3rd century. It is not known when the tax was formally abolished. Some historians credit the emperor Julian with its abolition in about 361 or 362.

Medieval revival 

The tax was revived in the Middle Ages in 1342 under the name of Opferpfennig by the Holy Roman Emperors. The Opferpfennig (originally Guldenpfennig) tax was introduced in 1342 by Emperor Louis IV the Bavarian, who ordered all Jews above the age of 12 and possessing 20 gulden to pay one gulden annually for protection. The practice was justified on the grounds that the emperor, as the legal successor of the Roman emperors, was the rightful recipient of the Temple tax which Jews paid to the Romans after the destruction of the Second Temple. The Opferpfennig was collected on Christmas day.

Emperor Charles IV later ordered the income of the Opferpfennig tax to be delivered to the archbishop of Trier. This tax was at some places replaced by an overall communal tax.

See also 
 Jewish poll tax
 Jizya
 Leibzoll
 Opferpfennig
 Rabbi tax
 Sicaricon
 Tolerance tax

Notes

References
 Edwards, Douglas R. (1996). Religion & Power: Pagans, Jews, and Christians in the Greek East. Oxford University Press. 
 Feldman, Louis H. (1993). Jew and Gentile in the Ancient World: Attitudes and Interactions from Alexander to Justinian. Princeton University Press. 
 Radin, Max (1915). The Jews among the Greeks and Romans. Philadelphia: Jewish Publication Society of America
 Schäfer, Peter (1998). Judeophobia: Attitudes toward the Jews in the Ancient World. Harvard University Press. 
 Stern, Menachem (1997). "Fiscus Judaicus". Encyclopaedia Judaica (CD-ROM Edition Version 1.0). Ed. Cecil Roth. Keter Publishing House. 
 O'Quin, Chris (2009). "The Fiscus Judaicus".
 Heemstra, Marius (2010). "". The Fiscus Judaicus and the Parting of the Ways. Tübingen: Mohr Siebeck.

External links
 Jewish Encyclopedia: Fiscus Judaicus
 Livius.org: Fiscus Judaicus
"The 'New Cleopatra' and the Jewish Tax" Biblical Archaeology Society
 Austin Simmons, The Cipherment of the Franks Casket (PDF) The fiscus Judaicus is depicted on the back side of the Franks Casket.

Jews and Judaism in the Roman Empire
Jewish–Roman wars
Latin political words and phrases
Personal taxes
Roman law
Vespasian
History of taxation
Disabilities (Jewish) in Europe
Taxation in ancient Rome